See Austin A40 for other A40 models and Austin A40 Sports for the sports car version of the Devon.

The A40 Countryman is an automobile that was produced by Austin in the United Kingdom from 1948 until 1956. It was a 2 door estate car version of the Austin A40 Van. Equipped as a six seater, its folding rear seat enabled it to be converted into a two seater able to carry a half ton load.

References

A40 Devon
1950s cars
Cars introduced in 1947

sv:Austin A40